The Sun God Festival is an annual campus festival at the University of California San Diego that takes place every spring quarter. The daytime festival is produced by the AS Concerts & Events office and paid for by the student body activity fee. The festival has featured a vast variety of entertaining elements since its inception, including a cross-campus fair, lounge areas, and multiple stages which have featured art performances, live comedy, student talent, DJ sets, and a mix of underground and commercially successful musical performers. All of this occurs on RIMAC Field. The main stage is traditionally opened by the winner of the Battle of the Bands, a competition that UCSD student musicians perform in leading up to the festival.

The festival's name references the Sun God, an on-campus statue by French artist Niki de Saint Phalle (1930–2002). The Sun God was the first contribution to the famous Stuart Collection. The first Sun God Festival coincided with the one-year anniversary of the statue's arrival in 1984. The festival's original location was adjacent to the statue, but it has since grown and moved numerous times, from Price Center to the now-demolished Mile High Field, eventually finding a more permanent home at its current location on RIMAC field.

The festival provides an opportunity for students to enjoy themselves and relax before midterm examinations, and is regarded as an end-of-the-year experience that provides a sense of campus community and celebration. Many members of campus, including police, administrators, student planners, and University staff work throughout the year to support the event, as it presents unique challenges due to its scale and culture. In recent years, the Festival has often been used as a platform to promote safety initiatives such as bystander intervention peer workshops, alcohol and drug education, and sexual assault awareness.

Due to the number of students who were being hospitalized from alcohol and drug abuse at the festival, students and administrators opted to eliminate guest tickets and increase safety measures. The changes saw a decrease in hospitalizations from 48 to eight from 2013 to 2014. These measures have improved the safety of the festival, but the loss of guest tickets and the increased security measures have also been a severe detriment to the event budget. 

During Spring Quarter of 2016, the Associated Students of UC San Diego ran a fee referendum to increase the student activity fee, which is the primary source of funding for the event. The new funding was meant to replace the festival's guest ticket revenue, which was lost when guests presented increased liabilities to student safety at the event. The student body overwhelmingly supported this fee increase in order to preserve the Sun God tradition, passing the referendum by a margin of nearly 40 percent.

In 2018, Associated Students replaced the headlining act, blackbear, with Roy Woods when blackbear cancelled on account of a series of pancreatic attacks. In 2020, the Sun God Festival was among the many public events cancelled due to the COVID-19 pandemic, over concerns that the virus could spread quickly at large gatherings such as concerts.

Past Lineups

1983 – Sparks
1985 – Los Lobos
1990 – The Call 
1991 – The Beat Farmers, The Untouchables
1992 – Blur, Senseless Things, Food For Fleet, Flatten Manhattan
1993 – Blues Traveler, Gin Blossoms, Blacksmith Union 
1994 – They Might Be Giants, No Doubt, Frente!, Brian Dewan
1995 – The Pharcyde, 311, B-Side Players, DJ Greyboy, Oversoul
1996 – Rocket from the Crypt, Souls of Mischief, Buck-O-Nine
1997 – De La Soul, Save Ferris, Clyde's Ride, Switchfoot, DJ DIEM
1998 – Social Distortion, The Roots, d.f. Rost
1999 – Cypress Hill, Reel Big Fish, Black Eyed Peas
2000 – Dishwalla, Rahzel, The Aquabats, F.o.N.
2001 – Naughty By Nature, Face To Face, XZIBIT
2002 – Cake, No Use For A Name
2003 – Mos Def, Bad Religion, Kinky, White Starr, Maxeen
2004 – Busta Rhymes, Goldfinger, The Dandy Warhols, Stellastarr, Moving Units, The Bronx
2005 – Ludacris, Phantom Planet, Damian Marley with Stephen Marley, Pretty Girls Make Graves, The Walkmen, Rufio
2006 – My Chemical Romance, Cypress Hill, Talib Kweli, No Use For A Name, Bedouin Soundclash, Ozma, Boy Sets Fire, The Fully Down, Versus The Mirror
2007 – T.I., Ozomatli, Third Eye Blind, Ben Kweller, Fifty On Their Heels, High Tide, Busdriver, Self Against City, Meho Plaza
2008 – Coheed and Cambria, Sean Kingston, Matt Costa, Say Anything, Living Legends, Richard Vission, The Aquabats, Little Brother, Sleepercar, Lady Dottie & The Diamonds, The Muslims, DJ Artistic, The Drowning Men, The Modlins, Bill Magee Blues Band, Radio Racer, Neon Trees, The Frantic Romantic, Masterpiece
2009 – N*E*R*D, Iron & Wine, Girl Talk, Motion City Soundtrack, Sara Bareilles, Augustana, The Cool Kids, Grand Ole Party, Rootbeer, DJ Nu-Mark, Nosaj Thing, Anavan; Nooners: Iglu & Hartly, Rob Crow, Dear And The Headlights, Lady Dottie & The Diamonds, The Shys, The Pheromones, Crash Kings, Wizard Wolves
2010 – Drake, Michelle Branch, Z-Trip, Relient K, Thrice, B.o.B, Crash Kings, The Parson Red Heads, Designer Drugs, Skeet Skeet, Robbed By Robots
2011 – Wiz Khalifa, Jimmy Eat World, Mike Posner, Crystal Castles, JFK of MSTRKRFT, Best Coast, Big Sean, LA Riots, Kill The Noise, Ocelot
2012 – Silversun Pickups, Paul Van Dyk, Chiddy Bang, Ra Ra Riot, Macklemore & Ryan Lewis, Tommy Trash, Dia Frampton, Murs, Tokimonsta, Clockwork, Oliver, Yacek
2013 – Kendrick Lamar, Porter Robinson, Portugal. The Man, Andrew McMahon, Danny Brown, Adrian Lux, Youngblood Hawke, RAC, DJ Geo-D, IndO
2014 – Diplo, Young the Giant, Juicy J, New Politics, The Colourist, Joey Bada$$, Ty Dolla $ign, Audien, Torro Torro, 2ToneDisco, Jhameel
2015 – Snoop Dogg, STRFKR, Jhené Aiko, OK Go, Mike Czech, DJ Demon
2016 – Miguel, Nico & Vinz, Louis the Child, Great Good Fine Ok
2017 – ScHoolboy Q, DJ Mustard, Bad Suns, Khalid, Manila Killa, Mild High Club, Kinjaz, 220 Second to None, Choreo Cookies, Mark Johns
2018 - Roy Woods, MadeinTYO, Sir Sly, Cuco, Robotaki, Ashe, Temporex, Sorah Yang, The GOOD Project, Choreo Cookies, Femme Fatale, 220 Second to None, Stay For the Fireworks
2019 - Vince Staples, Joji, Hayley Kiyoko, Whipped Cream, HUNNY
2020 - Festival cancelled due to COVID-19
2021 - Festival cancelled due to COVID-19
2022 - Iann Dior, Keshi, Umi, Peach Tree Rascals, Berhana

References

External links
 
 @UCSD: 2016 - Sun God Moves to a Saturday
 @UCSD: Lineup Released for 2016 Festival + Interview with AVP Walker
 @UCSD: Celebrating our Sun God
 @UCSD: 1997 Sun God Festival

University of California, San Diego
Festivals in San Diego
Music festivals in California
Music festivals established in 1983